Desmond Keith Dans (24 November 1924 – 2 January 2014) was an Australian trade unionist and politician who was a Labor Party member of the Legislative Council of Western Australia from 1971 to 1989, representing South Metropolitan Province. He served as a minister in the government of Brian Burke.

Dans was born in Perth to Mary (née Frances) and Keith Dans. He moved to Kalgoorlie as a child, where he attended a convent school before going on to the Kalgoorlie School of Mines. Dans enlisted in the Royal Australian Naval Reserve in 1942, and served as a stoker aboard HMAS Hobart. After the war's end, he joined the merchant marine, and became involved with the Seamen's Union. He served as state secretary of the union from 1959 to 1971. Dans was elected to parliament at the 1971 state election. He was made leader of the Labor Party in the Legislative Council in 1976, and elevated to the shadow cabinet in 1978. After Labor's victory at the 1983 state election, Dans was made Minister for Industrial Relations in the new ministry formed by Brian Burke. Following a reshuffle in December 1984, he was instead made Minister for Racing and Gaming and Minister for Tourism. Another reshuffle occurred after the 1986 election, and Dans became Minister for Works and Services, with responsibility for the 1987 America's Cup. He resigned from the ministry just over a month after the event's completion, and left parliament at the 1989 election.

References

|-

|-

1924 births
2014 deaths
Royal Australian Navy personnel of World War II
Australian Labor Party members of the Parliament of Western Australia
Australian trade unionists
Members of the Western Australian Legislative Council
Politicians from Perth, Western Australia
Royal Australian Navy sailors
People from Kalgoorlie
Military personnel from Western Australia